This is a list of the top 20 Philippine Basketball Association player statistical leaders by total career points scored.

As of today, Ramon Fernandez still leads the all-time scoring list. James Yap is the leading scorer for active players and is twelfth all-time.

Scoring leaders

Statistics accurate as of December 14, 2022

References

External links
PBA Official Website

Lists of Philippine Basketball Association players